Alfred Mégroz (1883 – 30 June 1956) was a Swiss figure skater. He competed in the singles at the 1920 Summer Olympics and finished eighth.

References

1883 births
1956 deaths
Olympic figure skaters of Switzerland
Figure skaters at the 1920 Summer Olympics
Swiss male single skaters